Clypeaster elongatus is a species of sea urchins of the Family Clypeasteridae. Their armour is covered with spines. Clypeaster elongatus was first scientifically described in 1948 by Hubert Lyman Clark.

See also 

 Clypeaster cyclopilus
 Clypeaster durandi
 Clypeaster euclastus

References 

Animals described in 1948
Clypeaster